Lindiwe Nonceba Sisulu (born 10 May 1954) is a South African politician, former member of parliament from 1994 until 2023, and a current member of the National Executive Committee of the African National Congress. She previously served as Minister of Housing (2004 to 2009), as Minister of Defence and Military Veterans (2009 to 2012), Minister of Public Service and Administration (2012 to 2014),Minister of Human Settlements from (2014 to 2018),  Minister of International Relations and Cooperation (2018 to 2019), Minister of Human Settlements, Water and Sanitation (2019 to 2021) and Minister of Tourism (2021 to 2023).

Early life
Sisulu was born to revolutionary leaders Walter and Albertina Sisulu in Johannesburg. She is the sister of journalist Zwelakhe Sisulu and politician Max Sisulu.

From 1975 to 1976, Sisulu was detained for her anti-apartheid activities. During her exile from 1977 to 1979 she joined the military wing of the ANC, Umkhonto we Sizwe, specialising in Intelligence.

Education
In 1973, Lindiwe Sisulu graduated from Waterford Kamhlaba United World College of Southern Africa in Mbabane, Swaziland. In 1980, Sisulu received a BA degree and Diploma in Education, and in 1981 received a BA Hons in History from the University of Swaziland. She also received an MA in History, and in 1989 an MPhil from the Centre for Southern African Studies at the University of York in the UK.

Early career
In the mid-1980s, Sisulu worked as a lecturer at the Manzini Teachers Training College. In 1990, she became the main assistant to Jacob Zuma in the ANC's intelligence services. Sub-editor, "The Times of Swaziland", Mbabane, Swaziland (1983). Chief Examiner, History for Junior Certificate Examinations Syndicate in Botswana, Lesotho and Swaziland (1985 - 1987). Consultant of the National Children's Rights Committee, United Nations Educational, Scientific and Cultural Organisation (UNESCO) (1992). Established a Policing Management Course at PDM, University of the Witwatersrand (1993).

Government career
Sisulu was first given an appointment in the government as deputy minister of home affairs in 1996, serving through 2001. While Minister of Defence, she appointed Tony Yengeni to the Defense Review Committee.

Presidential campaign

Sisulu has long been considered a potential presidential candidate, having passed on running in 2007 and 2012, she announced her presidential campaign on July 21 at Walter Sisulu square in Kliptown, where the Freedom Charter was adopted. Sisulu adopted the slogan "It's a Must" where she called on supporters to join her in a "must do" campaign. Upon announcing her intention to run for president, she said: "What we must do is to cleanse the ANC and recover its original values". On 15 December 2017, Sisulu withdrew from the presidential contest, choosing instead to run for the position of Deputy President. She was defeated by David Mabuza.

Minister of International Relations & Co-operation

When President Cyril Ramaphosa announced his reshuffled cabinet, Sisulu was moved from the Department of Human Settlements to the Department of International Relations and Co-operation, replacing Maite Nkoana-Mashabane.

Controversies
Lindiwe Sisulu's flagship housing project called the N2 Gateway has been embroiled in a number of controversies. Residents in Joe Slovo Informal Settlement adamantly refused to be relocated to Delft, Cape Town, to make way for government bond and free houses. After a protest by Joe Slovo residents, Sisulu drew significant criticism from civic groups for saying "if they choose not to cooperate with government, they will be completely removed from all housing waiting lists." A spate of letters exchanged between Sisulu and UWC Professor Martin Legassick also received attention because Legassick called into question Sisulu's refusal to meet directly with the residents of Joe Slovo.

In December 2007, the N2 Gateway also was host to the largest illegal occupation of houses in the country's history. The result has been the displacement of thousands of families into Temporary Relocation Areas and onto the pavement in Symphony Way.

In September 2009, she appointed Paul Ngobeni as her legal advisor. This appointment was immediately challenged from various quarters, including Parliament's Standing Committee on Public Accounts (SCOPA) and the Standing Committee on Defense, because he is not qualified to practice law in South Africa and has been disbarred from practicing law in the US where he also faces criminal charges for fraud, larceny and petty theft.

Sisulu became embroiled in a controversy in November 2012 when Parliament accused her of over-using executive jet flights during her tenure as Minister of Defence and Military Veterans. She was accused of making 203 trips with the South African Air Force rented Gulfstream plane, however due to administrative failures, this figure was incorrect and an apology was issued afterward. She had actually only made 35 trips.

In April 2013, she appointed Menzi Simelane as her legal advisor. In a judgement (in October 2012) finding him unfit to be appointed as head of the National Prosecuting Authority, Constitutional Court Judge Zac Jacoob said "[We] conclude that the evidence was contradictory and on its face indicative of Mr Simelane's honesty. It raises serious questions about Mr Simelane's conscientiousness, integrity, and credibility."

Awards
1979: Order of the Red Star.
1992: Human Rights Center Fellowship in Geneva.
2004: Presidential Award for Housing delivery by the Institute for Housing of South Africa.
2005: International Association for Housing Science Award.

Publications

(1990). "South African Women in Agricultural Sector" (pamphlet), York University.

References

1954 births
Living people
People from Johannesburg
Xhosa people
African National Congress politicians
Defence ministers of South Africa
Members of the National Assembly of South Africa
Alumni of the University of York
Anti-apartheid activists
Female defence ministers
Waterford Kamhlaba alumni
People educated at a United World College
University of Eswatini alumni
Women government ministers of South Africa
Women members of the National Assembly of South Africa
Female foreign ministers
Foreign ministers of South Africa